Linda Boström Knausgård (born 15 October 1972 in Boo, Sweden) is a Swedish author and poet. She debuted in 1998 with the poetry collection Gör mig behaglig för såret. Her critical breakthrough came in 2011 with the short-story collection Grand Mal. Her first novel, Helioskatastrofen, was released in 2013.

Literary career
Boström Knausgård debuted in 1998 with the poetry collection Gör mig behaglig för såret. Her breakthrough came in 2011 with the short-story collection Grand Mal which consists of twenty short, intense and tight prose texts in a  dark mode. Boström Knausgård suffers from a bipolar disorder. Her disorder was the subject of a radio documentary, titled Jag skulle kunna vara USA:s president, which she produced for Sveriges Radio in 2005. In 2013, her third book, the novel Helioskatastrofen, was released. In January 2013 she began writing chronicles for the regional newspaper Ystads Allehanda.

Personal life
Boström Knausgård was married to the Norwegian author Karl Ove Knausgård until November 2016. They lived in the Österlen-region in southeastern Sweden and have four children. She is the daughter of actress Ingrid Boström.

Bibliography
1998: Gör mig behaglig för såret
2011: Grand Mal
2013: Helioskatastrofen
2015: The Helios Disaster (in English translation by Rachel Willson-Broyles)
2016: Välkommen til Amerika
2019: Oktoberbarn
2021: October Child (in English translation by Saskia Vogel)

References

1972 births
Living people
People from Nacka Municipality
Swedish women short story writers
Swedish short story writers
Writers from Uppland
Swedish poets
Swedish women poets
Swedish women novelists